Brodhead's Coshocton expedition was a military expedition carried out by Patriot forces against the Lenape near Coshocton, Ohio in April 1781 during the American Revolutionary War. Led by Daniel Brodhead, the Patriots engaged and defeated several Lenape warriors, massacring 16 captives before burning Coshocton and the then-abandoned settlement of Lichtenau to the ground.

Background 
On April 7, Brodhead, 150 Continental Army regulars, and 134 Pennsylvania militiamen headed out along the Ohio River. Fearing the neutral Lenape Turtle Clan of Coshocton would soon be joining the British as the more aggressive Wolf Clan had, they embarked with the initial purpose of securing the Turtle Clan's alliance. However, the ever-increasing attacks against settlers made by the Wolf Clan caused many within Brodhead's ranks to seek retribution, and the mission became an active military campaign.

Expedition 
Brodhead first reached the main Turtle Clan village of Gekelmukpechunk, now known as Newcomerstown, Ohio. He requested a discussion between the principal chiefs of the village, and three were sent to meet him. His initial hope was to secure the allegiance of the villagers and enlist new warriors into his campaign. Unfortunately, a militiaman known as Lewis Wetzel attacked and killed one of the peaceful chiefs just as they had crossed the river to meet. Fearing massive losses and an unplanned battle, Brodhead retreated and refocused his troops on their initial goal of reaching Coshocton.

On April 20, Brodhead and his men, including some U.S.-aligned Lenape, raided and destroyed the pacifist Moravian Christian Lenape settlement of Indaochaic also known as Lichtenau. Then the troop, aided by Lenape chief Gelelemend, traveled to the nearby village of Goschachgunk, now known as Coshocton, Ohio. He divided his men into three regiments and laid their village to waste. On the first night, 16 warriors were captured, taken south of the village, and slaughtered; another 20 were killed in battle, and 20 civilians were taken prisoner.

Five of those captured were Moravian Christian Lenape, who were released. Brodhead and Colonel Davis Shepherd did not further attack the Moravian Christian settlements, such as Schoenbrunn, Gnadenhutten and Salem, which housed Christian Indians and missionaries such as John Heckewelder, as Brodhead declared that "these Indians had conducted themselves from the commencement of the war in a manner that did them honour." Brodhead and his soldiers received food from these Moravian Christian Indian villages. Feeling his expedition at the end and his troops' anger satiated, Brodhead returned to Pennsylvania.

Aftermath
In 1782, colonists from Pennsylvania came back to the area. This was a privatized militia made up of primarily Pennsylvanian settlers attempting to avenge attacks on settlers in Western Pennsylvania. After falsely promising protection to the Moravian Christian Lenape and Moravian Christian Mahicans, the Pennsylvania militia attacked the pacifist Moravian Christian settlement of Gnadenhutten in what would become known as the Gnadenhutten massacre, with those who were murdered being recognized as Christian martyrs. This is also the settlement which housed many of the surviving people from the previously raided and destroyed the settlement of Lichtenau.  

There is now a historical marker in the city of Coshocton at 40° 16.554' N, 81° 50.659' W.

References

External links 
 By State Historical Society of Wisconsin, Lyman Copeland Draper, Reuben Gold Thwaites, Milo Milton Quaife
 By HMdb.org, The Historical Marker Database, William Fisher Jr., Keith W.

1781 in the United States
Battles of the American Revolutionary War in Ohio
Battles in the Western theater of the American Revolutionary War
Conflicts in 1781
Lenape
Massacres committed by the United States
Massacres in 1781
Massacres in the American Revolutionary War
Massacres of Native Americans
Tuscarawas County, Ohio